The Men's Greco-Roman 75 kg competition of the Wrestling events at the 2015 Pan American Games in Toronto were held on July 15 at the Mississauga Sports Centre.

Schedule
All times are Eastern Daylight Time (UTC-4).

Results
Legend
F — Won by fall

Cuban wrestler Julio Bastida was entered into the competition but did not compete and was not a part of the draw.

Final

Repechage

References

Wrestling at the 2015 Pan American Games
Greco-Roman wrestling